Invariance is a French magazine edited by Jacques Camatte, published since 1968.

It emerged from the Italian left-communist tradition associated with Amadeo Bordiga and it originally bore the subtitle "Invariance of the theory of the proletariat", indicating Bordiga's notion of the unchanging nature of communist theory. Invariance was instrumental in bringing unknown and obscure texts of the Communist Left (Bordiga and the Italian Left, Gorter and Pannekoek from the Dutch-German Left, as well as many others, including Lukacs and Sylvia Pankhurst to the attention of the '68 generation. It also played a major -albeit largely unknown- role in the 1970's crises and dissolution of councilist organisations such as ICO in France and Solidarity in the UK. However, around 1972-75 it broke with many of the tenets of Bordigism and Marxism per se, arguing that in the aftermath of May '68 there was no longer any potential for the working class to escape the domination of capital through revolution. Instead it began to take the line that humanity itself had become "domesticated" by the rule of capital and the only solution was to "leave this world", a view which came to influence Fredy Perlman, John Zerzan and others in their development of Anarcho-primitivism. It was this radical shift in orientation which caused many of its critics to observe: "nothing varies more than Invariance ".

Invariance is now in its fifth series and appears sporadically. Every cover features the same image of a tree (held to represent that "all is life"), and on the back the phrase: "Time is the invention of men incapable of love".

Publications
 La gauche allemande: Textes du KAPD, de L'AAUD, de L'AAUE et de la KAI (1920-1922)

External links
 

1968 establishments in France
Bordigism
Communist magazines
French-language magazines
Political magazines published in France
Left communism
Magazines established in 1968